The men's marathon event at the 1994 Commonwealth Games was held in Victoria, British Columbia on 28 August.

Results

References

Marathon
1994
Comm
1994 Commonwealth Games